James Mary Early O'Grady (March 31, 1863 Rochester, Monroe County, New York – November 3, 1928 Rochester, Monroe Co., NY) was an American lawyer and politician. He was Speaker of the New York State Assembly for two terms and served one term in Congress.

Life
He graduated from the University of Rochester in 1885. He studied law, was admitted to the bar in 1885, and practiced in Rochester. He served as member of the Board of Education of Rochester from 1887 to 1892, and was president in 1891 and 1892.

He was a member of the New York State Assembly (Monroe Co., 2nd D.) in 1893, 1894, 1895, 1896, 1897 and 1898; and was Speaker in 1897 and 1898.

O'Grady was elected as a Republican to the 56th United States Congress, holding office from March 4, 1899, to March 3, 1901. Afterwards he resumed the practice of law in Rochester. He was interred in the Holy Sepulchre Catholic Cemetery.

External links

1863 births
1928 deaths
University of Rochester alumni
American Roman Catholics
Speakers of the New York State Assembly
Republican Party members of the United States House of Representatives from New York (state)